Imo State is a state in the South-East geopolitical zone of Nigeria, bordered to the north by Anambra State, Rivers State to the west and south, and Abia State to the east. It takes its name from the Imo River which flows along the state's eastern border. The state capital is Owerri and its state nickname is the "Eastern Heartland."

Of the 36 states, Imo is the third smallest in area but is fourteenth most populous with an estimated population of over 5.4 million as of 2016. Geographically, the State is divided between the Niger Delta swamp forests in the far east and the drier Cross–Niger transition forests in the rest of the State. Other key geographical features are the state's rivers and lakes with the Awbana, Imo, Orashi, and Otamiri rivers along with the Oguta Lake in western Imo State.

Modern-day Imo State has been inhabited for years by various ethnic groups, primarily the Igbo people with the Igbo language serving as a lingua franca alongside English throughout the State. In the pre-colonial period, what is now Imo State was a part of medieval Kingdom of Nri and the later Aro Confederacy before the latter was defeated in the early 1900s by British troops in the Anglo-Aro War. After the war, the British incorporated the area into the Southern Nigeria Protectorate which later merged into British Nigeria in 1914; after the merger, Imo became a centre of anti-colonial resistance during the Women's War.

After independence in 1960, the area of the present-day Imo was a part of the post-independence Eastern Region until 1967 when the region was split and the area became part of the East Central State. Less than two months afterwards, the former Eastern Region attempted to secede in the three-year long Nigerian Civil War with Imo as a part of the secessionist, Igbo nationalist state of Biafra. The area was hard fought over throughout the war with Owerri and its surrounding area exchanging hands twice before Owerri was named the Biafran capital in 1969. The present-day Imo State was captured by federal forces in early 1970 with Operation Tail-Wind taking the city and ending the war. At the war's end and the reunification of Nigeria, the East Central State was reformed until 1976 when Imo State was formed by the Murtala Muhammed regime. Fifteen years afterwards, Imo State was divided with eastern Imo being broken off to form the new Abia State.

The State economy is highly dependent on agricultural production, especially the production of palm oil, which a majority of citizens rely on for cooking. A key minor industry is the extraction of crude oil and natural gas, especially in Imo's north and west. The State has been beset by violence at various points throughout its history, most notably the anti-cult 1996 Otokoto Riots and the ongoing separatist violence from the Eastern Security Network along with other opportunistic nativist gunmen. Despite unrest, with its fast growing population and industrialization, Imo State has the joint-sixth highest Human Development Index in the country.

Location
Imo State is bordered by Abia State on the East, River Niger and Delta State to the West, Anambra State on the North, and Rivers State to the South. The state lies within latitudes 4°45'N and 7°15'N, and longitude 6°50'E and 7°25'E, with an area of around 5,100 sq km.

Natural resources
The State has several natural resources which includes, crude oil, natural gas, lead, Calcium Carbonate, solar and wind power, zinc.

Profitable flora including iroko, mahogany, obeche, bamboo, rubber tree and oil palm. Additionally white clay, fine sand and limestone are also found in the State.

Oil and gas exploration
There are over 163 oil wells, at over 12 different locations in the State. The main petroleum companies operating in the State are Addax Petroleum, Chevron Corporation, Royal Dutch Shell and Agip. Some of the established oil-rich local government councils include: Ohaji/Egbema, Oguta, Oru East, Iho, Oru West, Obowo and Ngor Okpala.

Investment opportunities
Many investment opportunities exist in the State including oil and gas exploration, chemical plants, brewery plants, hydroelectric plants, gas-fired power plants, grain mills, starch production, cashews, fruit and vegetable juice concentrate production, integrated multi-oil seed processing plants, ceramics, inland waterway transport, and palm produce industry.

Independent global brewer Heineken, through its subsidiary Nigerian Breweries, has significant investment in Imo State. The company manages the world-class Awo-omamma Brewery, a multiple-line plant.

Many more oil and gas opportunities are yet to be developed. The federal government has been called to inspect newly discovered oil-rich areas, which might help foster economic development and job creation.

Industrial parks and processing zones to harness the huge agricultural produce and minerals would give a major boost to the state's economic growth and industrialization.

Oguta Lake, Palm Beach Holiday Resort in Awo-omamma , and a host of other tourist sites along the banks of the 26 km-length Njaba River present hotspots for tourism.

Agriculture
Agriculture is the primary occupation, but due to over-farming and high population density, the soil has greatly degraded.This could be as a result of inefficient production techniques, poor resource base, declining soil productivity, predominance of primitive techniques of agricultural production, inadequate supply of credit, low capital investment, use of crude implements to mention but a few. The Agricultural sector in Imo State, needs the intervention of the state government and other huge private companies, this is because having a strong economy based on crude oil, natural gas and palm oil will not aid for the development of the State.

Climate change
The rainy season begins in April and lasts until October, with annual rainfall varying from 1,500 mm to 2,200 mm (60 to 80 inches).

An average annual temperature above , creates an annual relative humidity of 75%. With humidity reaching 90% in the rainy season. The dry season experiences two months of Harmattan, from late December to late February. The hottest months are between January and March.

With high population density and over farming, the soil has been degraded and much of the native vegetation has disappeared.

This deforestation has triggered soil erosion, which is compounded by heavy seasonal rainfall that has led to the destruction of houses and roads.

History 
Imo State came into existence in 1976, along with other new states created under the leadership of the late military ruler of Nigeria, Murtala Muhammed, having been previously part of East-Central State. The state is named after the Imo River, which bears the name of a prominent Nigerian family with that family name, who were the chiefs of Imo State before the ratification of a more formal government. Part of it was split off in 1991 as Abia State, and another part became Ebonyi State.

Imo State was created at Ngwoma, and the meetings for the state creation which began after the Nigerian Civil War ended in 1970 were chaired by Eze S. E. Onukogu.

Riots

The people of Imo State carried out the Otokoto riots of 1996, which was a statewide protest, in response to the  serial kidnappings and murders occurring in Imo at that point in time. One of the most remarkable riots that took place in Imo state, that led to the destruction of properties was the #ENDSARS protest. This protest which started peacefully not only in Imo state, led to riots and destruction of police stations, and killing of security personnel#ENDSARS in Imo State.

Government
The State has a three-tier administrative structure: State, Local and Autonomous community levels. The three arms at state level are the Executive, the Legislative and the Judiciary. The executive arm is headed by an elected Governor, who is assisted by a deputy governor, commissioners and executive advisers.

This is a list of administrators and governors of Imo State since its creation.

The legislative arm is headed by the Speaker of the State House of Assembly. The current Speaker is Rt. Hon. Emeka Nduka , and his deputy is Rt. Hon. Amara iwuanyanwu . The remainder of the house is made up of elected legislators, from the 27 LGAs of the State.

The judiciary is made up of the high court of justice and the customary court of appeal, and is headed by the Chief Judge of the State.

Local Government Areas

Imo State consists of 27 local government areas:

Aboh Mbaise
Ahiazu Mbaise
Ehime Mbano
Ezinihitte Mbaise
Ideato North
Ideato South
Ihitte/Uboma
Ikeduru
Isiala Mbano
Isu
Mbaitoli
Ngor Okpala
Njaba
Nkwerre
Nwangele
Obowo
Oguta
Ohaji/Egbema
Okigwe
Onuimo
Orlu
Orsu
Oru East
Oru West
Owerri Municipal
Owerri North
Owerri West
Njaba South 

Smaller jurisdictions in the state may receive township status or urban status.

Demographics
The state has over 4.8 million people, and the population density varies from 230 to 1,400 people per square kilometre.  Christianity is the major religion. In addition to its capital, other notable towns are Orlu, Obowo, Oguta, Awo-Omamma, Mgbidi, Mbaise, Okigwe and Ohaji/Egbema.

Imo State is a predominantly Igbo speaking state, with Igbo people constituting a majority of 98%.

Politics 
The State government is led by a democratically elected governor who works closely with members of the state's house of assembly. The Capital city of the State is Owerri.

Electoral system 
The electoral  system of each state is selected using a modified two-round system. To be elected in the first round, a candidate must receive the plurality of the vote and over 25% of the vote in at least two -third of the State local government Areas. If no candidate passes threshold, a second round will be held between the top candidate and the next candidate to have received a plurality of votes in the highest number of local government Areas.

Education

Institutions of higher learning 
There are several institutions of higher learning including both state and federal government run institutions such as:
 Eastern Palm University, Ogboko, Ideato
 Federal Polytechnic, Nekede
 Federal University of Technology Owerri
 Hezekiah University, Umudi
 Imo State University, Owerri
Imo State Polytechnic, Umuagwo

Alvan Ikoku College of Education
University of Agriculture and Environmental Science, Umuagwo
Federal College of Land and Water Resources, Oforola

Environmental issues

Soil erosion 

Soil Erosion is the most common geo-environmental hazard in Imo State, with over 360 erosion sites, out of which 57 are confirmed to be critical and in need of immediate remediation. They are mostly gully erosion found in Ideato, Orlu, Ihitte-uboma, Arondizuogu, Umuomi-ikeduru and Njaba areas of the state. These gullies are attributed mainly to poor civil engineering works, specifically road/gutter construction as well as sand mining. During road construction, adequate control of the runoff generated in this process is poorly taken into consideration. There is also no proper termination, spill way, and gabions to lower intense flow to non-erosion velocities during gutter construction. Hence, rainwater overflow from concrete gutters resulting in erosion, especially at the intersection of gutter and road.

Due to gullies, farmlands have been significantly affected, with both farmlands and their road paths lost. There is also loss of social infrastructures such as, electricity and pipe-borne waters. Communities such as Ikeduru, Orlu, Ehime Mbano, Nwangele, Nkwerre and Mbaitoli dependent on stream and harvested rain water for domestic use have been impacted due to surface water/stream pollution caused by intense runoffs from the gully sites.

Nigeria Erosion and Watershed Management Project (NEWMAP), kick-started in the state on November 11, 2014 and the ecological fund are some of the interventions for soil erosion in the State. Communities such as Eziala- Obizi in Ezinihitte Mbaise LGA; Iyiuzo-Ihioma-Ogberuru in Orlu LGA; Umueshi-Amanato in Ideato South LGA; Umuturu -Ezemazu -Urualla in Ideato North LGA; Umunumo Ibeafor in Ehime Mbano LGA; and Umueze Obazu-Mbieri in Mbaitoli LGA are beneficiaries of the NEWMAP project in Imo State.

Flooding 
Available research identifies Oguta, Ohaji/Egbema, Ngor Okpala, Owerri West, Owerri North, Aboh Mbaise and Owerri municipal LGAs as very high flood areas; Mbaitolu, Ikeduru, Aboh Mbaise, Onuimo, IhiteUboma, Obowo and Ehime Mbano  LGAs as moderate flood hazard areas; and northern of Isiala Mbano, Nwangele, Nkwere, Orlu, Ehime Mbano and Southern part of Ideato North, Okigwe and Ideato South LGAs as low flood hazard areas.

In August 2019, flooding caused by heavy rain submerged about 70 houses, displaced 2000 villagers and destroyed farmlands in Orsu-Obodo community, in the Oguta local government area. Many residents in the state capital (Owerri) were also displaced in 2017. The Orlu-Umuchima-Obiohia-Akokwa-Uga federal road has been cut off by gully erosion thereby leaving motorists and other road users stranded.

Notable people

Sport
 
 
 Chioma Ajunwa – 1996 Olympic gold long jumper
 Chidobe Awuzie - cornerback for the Cincinnati Bengals
 Kelechi Iheanacho – striker for Leicester City, U-17 World Cup winner and tournament's MVP (2013)
 Samuel Okwaraji (1964–1989) – national footballer
 Levi Onwuzurike- defensive tackle for Detroit Lions 2021–present

Arts
 
 
 Obianuju Catherine Acholonu – author
 Charly Boy – hip hop singer and activist
 Rita Dominic – Nigerian actress
 Prince Eke - Nollywood actor
 Ada Jesus – Nigerian actress and comedienne
 John Munonye – author
 Genevieve Nnaji – Nollywood actress
 Alban Uzoma Nwapa – Eurodance musician
 Onyeka Nwelue – author, scholar, actor, entrepreneur
 Christogonus Ezebuiro Obinna – highlife musician
 Onyeka Onwenu – singer, actress and politician
Benjamin Okorie highlife musician
Kingsley Okorie highlife musician

Politics
 
 
 Pats Acholonu – Supreme Court Justice
 Chris Anyanwu – journalist and senator
 Ifeanyi Ararume – former senator of Okigwe zone (1999-2007)
 Kema Chikwe – former Minister of Aviation
 Sebastian Okechukwu Mezu – Nigerian writer, scholar, philanthropist, publisher, and politician
 Chile Eboe-Osuji - Judge, International Court of Criminal Justice, Hague
 Evan Enwerem – former governor and former President of the Senate
 Emeka Ihedioha - former Governor and Chief whip Nigeria House of Representatives
 Maurice Iwu – former INEC chairman
 Emmanuel Iwuanyanwu – politician and businessman
 Prince Eze Madumere - former Deputy Governor
 K. O. Mbadiwe – former Minister of Commerce and Industry
 Sam Mbakwe – former Governor
Henry Nwawuba - Politician and Entrepreneur
 Raymond Njoku – former Minister of Transportation
 Chukwuemeka Nwajiuba - former House of Representatives Member and current Minister of the Federal Republic Of Nigeria
 Arthur Nzeribe – former Senator Orlu Zone, Member of the Senate of Nigeria in the 4th National Assembly (1999-2003)
 Walter Ofonagoro – former Minister of Information and Culture
 Ikedi Ohakim – former governor
 Chris Okewulonu – Chief of Staff
 Rochas Okorocha – former governor and a serving senator representing Imo West, under investigation as of May 2022
 Fabian Osuji – former Minister of Education
 Ugonna Ozurigbo – Deputy Speaker, Imo State House of Assembly (2015–), and Member
 Achike Udenwa – former Governor
 Hope Uzodinma - Governor of Imo state

Other
 
 
 Adiele Afigbo – historian
 Michael Echeruo – academic and writer in Igbo studies
 Nenny B – media personality
 Evelyn Okere – Nigerian businesswoman, publisher, fashion designer
 Odumeje — Clergyman.

References

External links 
  — 

 
States of Nigeria
States in Igboland
States and territories established in 1976
Library of Congress Africa Collection related
1976 establishments in Nigeria